The Black Out the Sun Tour was the sixth headlining concert tour by American country music group the Zac Brown Band, in support of their album Jekyll + Hyde (2015). The tour began on March 19, 2016, in Teton Village, Wyoming and ended on April 21, 2017, in Sydney, Australia.

The band announced the tour in February 2016. On September 21, 2016, two Australian tour dates were announced.

Concert synopsis
The show is filled with their own material and covers. They perform songs from their current album Jekyll + Hyde such as "Castaway", "Beautiful Drug", "Homegrown", and "I'll Be Your Man (Song for a Daughter)", past hits like "Chicken Fried", "Knee Deep", "Colder Weather" and covers such as Van Morrison's "Into the Mystic", The Who's "Baba O'Riley", and Dolly Parton's "Jolene".

Production
The back of the stage is covered by a video screen that shows images and visuals. There is also another video screen on the stage where the horns, vocalists and percussionists stand.

Opening acts
Drake White & The Big Fire
Brothers Osborne, Maren Morris and Marty Stuart (C2C festival only)

Setlist
Not all songs are performed at every show, and in not always in the same order. 

"Castaway"
"Whiskey's Gone"
Mashup: "Free"/"Into the Mystic" 
"Sweet Annie"
"Chicken Fried"
"Wind"
"As She's Walking Away
"S.O.B."
"It's Not OK"
"I'll Be Your Man (Song for a Daughter)"
"Toes"
"Keep Me in Mind"
Colder Weather"
"Beautiful Drug"
"Loving You Easy"
"Knee Deep"
"The Day I Die"
"On This Train"
"One Day"
"Tomorrow Never Comes" 
"Highway 20 Ride"
"Let's Go Easy"
"Quiet Your Mind"
"Homegrown"

Covers
"All Apologies" 
"Baba O'Riley" 
"The Devil Went Down to Georgia" 
"Enter Sandman 
"Head Like a Hole" 
"Hotel California" 
"Jolene" 
"The Way You Look Tonight"

Tour dates

Festivals

Cancellations and rescheduled shows

Critical reception
Timothy Finn of The Kansas City Star says "the show wasn't flawless" and did not like how long the band introductions went but overall "was one long exhibition of this band's virtuosity and personality".

References

2016 concert tours
Zac Brown Band concert tours